Great Britain, represented by the British Olympic Association (BOA), competed at the 1964 Summer Olympics in Tokyo, Japan. 204 competitors, 160 men and 44 women, took part in 124 events in 17 sports. British athletes have competed and won at least one gold medal in every Summer Olympic Games.  Future Liberal Democrat leader Menzies Campbell represented Britain at the 200m.

Medallists

Gold
 Ken Matthews — Athletics, Men's 20 km Walk
 Lynn Davies — Athletics, Men's Long Jump
 Ann Packer — Athletics, Women's 800 metres
 Mary Rand — Athletics, Women's Long Jump

Silver
 Basil Heatley — Athletics, Men's Marathon
 John Cooper — Athletics, Men's 400 m Hurdles
 Maurice Herriott — Athletics, Men's 3000 m Steeplechase
 Adrian Metcalfe, Robbie Brightwell, John Cooper, and Tim Graham — Athletics, Men's 4 × 400 m Relay
 Paul Nihill — Athletics, Men's 50 km Walk
 Ann Packer — Athletics, Women's 400 metres
 Mary Rand — Athletics, Women's Pentathlon
 Henry Hoskyns — Fencing, Men's Épée Individual
 John Russell, Hugh Wardell-Yerburgh, William Barry, and John James — Rowing, Men's Coxless Fours
 Robert McGregor — Swimming, Men's 100 m Freestyle
 Louis Martin — Weightlifting, Men's Middle Heavyweight
 Keith Musto and Tony Morgan — Sailing, Men's Flying Dutchman

Bronze
 Janet Simpson, Daphne Arden, Dorothy Hyman, and Mary Rand — Athletics, Women's  4 × 100 m Relay
 Peter Robeson — Equestrian, Jumping Individual

Athletics

Men's Hammer Throw
Howard Payne
Qualifying Round — 61.90m (→ did not advance, 17th place)

Boxing

Canoeing

Cycling

Twelve cyclists represented Great Britain in 1964.

Individual road race
 Colin Lewis
 Terry West
 Derek Harrison
 Michael Cowley

Team time trial
 Bob Addy
 Michael Cowley
 Derek Harrison
 Colin Lewis

Sprint
 Karl Barton
 Christopher Church

1000m time trial
 Roger Whitfield

Tandem
 Karl Barton
 Christopher Church

Individual pursuit
 Hugh Porter

Team pursuit
 Trevor Bull
 Harry Jackson
 Hugh Porter
 Brian Sandy

Diving

Equestrian

Fencing

13 fencers, 9 men and 4 women, represented Great Britain in 1964.

Men's foil
 Bill Hoskyns
 Allan Jay
 Sandy Leckie

Men's team foil
 Bill Hoskyns, Allan Jay, Sandy Leckie, Ralph Cooperman, Derrick Cawthorne

Men's épée
 Bill Hoskyns
 Allan Jay
 Peter Jacobs

Men's team épée
 Bill Hoskyns, John Pelling, Peter Jacobs, Michael Howard, Allan Jay

Men's sabre
 Ralph Cooperman
 Sandy Leckie
 Richard Oldcorn

Men's team sabre
 Richard Oldcorn, Sandy Leckie, Ralph Cooperman, Michael Howard, Bill Hoskyns

Women's foil
 Mary Watts-Tobin
 Shirley Netherway
 Janet Bewley-Cathie-Wardell-Yerburgh

Women's team foil
 Shirley Netherway, Theresa Offredy, Janet Bewley-Cathie-Wardell-Yerburgh, Mary Watts-Tobin

Gymnastics

Hockey

Judo

Four male Judoka represented Great Britain in 1964.

Individual
 Brian Jacks
 Syd Hoare
Tony Sweeney
Alan Petherbridge

Modern pentathlon

Three male pentathletes represented Great Britain in 1964.

Individual
 Benjamin Finnis
 Robert Phelps
 Jim Fox

Team
 Benjamin Finnis
 Robert Phelps
 Jim Fox

Rowing

Double scull - Arnold Cooke and Peter Webb - Seventh
Coxless pair - David Lee Nicholson and Stewart Farquharson  - Fourth
 Coxless four - John Russell, Hugh Wardell-Yerburgh, William Barry, and John James  - Silver

Sailing

Shooting

Eight shooters represented Great Britain in 1964.

25 m pistol
 Tony Clark
 Alan Bray

50 m pistol
 Anthony Chivers
 Harry Cullum

50 m rifle, prone
 Peter Morgan
 John Hall

Trap
 Bob Braithwaite
 Joe Wheater

Swimming

Weightlifting
Louis Martin

Wrestling

References

Nations at the 1964 Summer Olympics
1964
Summer Olympics